Robert "Rocky" Eugene Bernard, Jr. (born April 19, 1979) is a former American football defensive tackle who was drafted by the Seattle Seahawks in the fifth round of the 2002 NFL Draft. He played college football at Texas A&M.

Professional career

Seattle Seahawks
Bernard was drafted by the Seahawks in the fifth round of the 2002 NFL Draft. Bernard was mostly used as a backup in his first three seasons in the league before becoming the starting right defensive tackle in 2005, earning 8.5 sacks with two more in the NFC Championship Game against the Carolina Panthers. Bernard amassed a total of forty-two tackles in the 2005 season.

On August 30, 2008, the National Football League suspended Bernard for the Seahawks' 2008 season opener for violating the league's personal conduct policy.  Bernard was arrested in April on investigation of domestic violence.  He allegedly punched his ex-girlfriend in the forehead.  He lost $235,000 in salary for the suspension.

New York Giants
On February 28, 2009, Bernard signed a four-year, $16 million contract with the New York Giants. The deal contains $6.9 million guaranteed, including a $5 million signing bonus and his first-year base salary.

Bernard was released on July 28, 2011. He was re-signed by the Giants on August 4. He earned a Super Bowl ring when the Giants defeated the New England Patriots in Super Bowl XLVI. Following the season, he became an unrestricted free agent.

References

1979 births
Living people
American football defensive tackles
New York Giants players
People from Baytown, Texas
Players of American football from Texas
Seattle Seahawks players
Sportspeople from Harris County, Texas
Texas A&M Aggies football players